Jörg Bastuck (4 September 1969 in Dillingen, Saarland, Germany – 24 March 2006 in Salou, Spain) was a German co-driver in the Junior World Rally Championship. When he got out of his Citroën C2 GT, driven by compatriot Aaron Burkart to change a tire, he was hit by the Ford Fiesta ST of Barry Clark (co-driven by Scott Martin), during the 2006 Rally of Catalunya in northeastern Spain.

Bastuck was flown by helicopter to the John XXIII Hospital in Tarragona, where he died, event organizers said in a statement. No one else was injured. He was 36 years old.

References 

1969 births
2006 deaths
People from Saarlouis (district)
German rally drivers
German rally co-drivers
Sport deaths in Spain
Racing drivers who died while racing
World Rally Championship co-drivers